is the 50th single by the J-pop group Morning Musume. It was released in Japan on July 4, 2012.

Background
The  release was announced during the Morning Musume's May 18 concert at Nippon Budokan, at which its title and release date were made public. The song "One Two Three" was premiered at the Girls Award 2012 Spring/Summer ceremony on May 26.

This is Morning Musume's first single with Sayumi Michishige as leader of the group.
It is also the first single in over 10 years to not feature a 5th generation member since "Mr. Moonlight (Ai no Big Band)" and the first in over 5 years to not feature an 8th generation member since "Egao Yes Nude".

Release details
The single will be released in seven versions: a regular edition and six limited editions: A, B, C, D, E, and F.

All limited editions will contain an additional song: A and B – a track sung by the 6th generation members (Sayumi Michishige and Tanaka Reina), C and D – a track sung by the 9th generation members (Mizuki Fukumura, Erina Ikuta, Riho Sayashi, Kanon Suzuki), E and F – a track sung by the 10th generation members (Haruna Iikubo, Ayumi Ishida, Masaki Sato, Haruka Kudo).

The Limited Editions A, C, and E will come with a bonus DVD containing a special version of the music video for the song "One Two Three", while the Regular Edition and the Limited Editions B, D, and F will be CD-only.

Also, all the limited editions will include an entry card for the lottery to win a launch event ticket.

Reception 
The single debuted at the 2nd position in the daily Oricon singles ranking and obtained the third position in the weekly Oricon chart.

In August 2012, the single was certified Gold by the Recording Industry Association of Japan for shipment to retailers of 100,000 units.

Members
 6th generation: Sayumi Michishige, Reina Tanaka
 9th generation: Mizuki Fukumura, Erina Ikuta, Riho Sayashi, Kanon Suzuki
 10th generation: Haruna Iikubo, Ayumi Ishida, Masaki Sato, Haruka Kudo

One Two Three Vocalists

Main Voc: Reina Tanaka, Riho Sayashi

Center Voc: Sayumi Michishige, Mizuki Fukumura, Masaki Sato

Minor Voc: Erina Ikuta, Kanon Suzuki, Haruna Iikubo, Ayumi Ishida, Haruka Kudo

The Matenrou Show Vocalists

Main Voc: Reina Tanaka

Center Voc: Riho Sayashi

Minor Voc: Sayumi Michishige, Mizuki Fukumura, Erina Ikuta, Kanon Suzuki, Haruna Iikubo, Ayumi Ishida, Masaki Sato, Haruka Kudo

Track listing

Regular Edition

Limited Editions A, B

Limited Editions C, D

Limited Editions E, F

Bonus
Sealed into the Limited Editions A, B, C, D, E, F:
 Event ticket lottery card with a serial number

Charts

References

External links
 Profile on the Hello! Project official website 
 Profile on the Up-Front Works official website 

2012 singles
Japanese-language songs
Morning Musume songs
Songs written by Tsunku
Song recordings produced by Tsunku
Zetima Records singles
Japanese synth-pop songs
Dance-pop songs